Manuel Masineira was a Cuban baseball catcher and third baseman in the Cuban League and Negro leagues. He played with Almendares in 1903, Carmelita in 1904, Habana in 1905, and the Cuban Stars (West) in 1906.

References

External links
 and Seamheads

Year of birth missing
Cuban League players
Cuban baseball players
Almendares (baseball) players
Carmelita players
Cuban Stars (West) players
Habana players
Year of death unknown